The Wilcox Solar Observatory (WSO) is a solar observatory in Stanford, California that is used to produce daily observations of the magnetic and velocity field at the Sun's surface. It began daily observations of the Sun's mean magnetic field in May 1975. It would later be named after solar physicist John M. Wilcox. WSO has historically been funded by NASA Heliophysics, the National Science Foundation, and the Office of Naval Research.

WSO uses a Littrow spectrograph together with a Babcock magnetograph on the 
5250 Å iron-1 spectral line, which it compares to the close by and magnetically insensitive iron-1 line at 5124 Å, to estimate the line-of-sight photospheric magnetic field to within 0.04 gauss.

References

External links
WSO - The Wilcox Solar Observatory

Astronomical observatories
Solar telescopes